Anne Haug (born 20 January 1983, in Bayreuth) is a German professional triathlete, National Duathlon Champion of the years 2008 and 2009, and vice Triathlon Champion of the year 2009. She represents the clubs TV 1848 Erlangen, Team Icehouse, and LG Stadtwerke München.

Anne Haug studied sports at the Technological University of Munich (TU München). She lives in Bayreuth and Munich.

In 2012, she competed at the Olympic Games and finished in 11th place.

In 2019, Haug claimed her first Ironman World Championship title, finishing in a time of 8:40:10, making her the third-fastest female in World Championship history.

In 2021, Haug won the Europe Triathlon Challenge Long Distance Championships, known as Challenge Roth, in a time of 7:53:48, completing a 3.86 km swim, a 166.6 km long bike segment and a 41.65 km run.

ITU competitions 
In the four years from 2007 to 2010, Haug took part in 19 ITU competitions and achieved 14 top ten positions. In 2011, she started the new season with two ITU elite medals: bronze in Antalya and gold in Quarteira.

The following list is based upon the official ITU rankings and the ITU Athletes's Profile Page.

Unless indicated otherwise, the following events are triathlons (Olympic Distance) and belong to the Elite category.

BG = the sponsor British Gas · DNF = did not finish · DNS = did not start

References

External links 
  
 
 
 
 

1983 births
Living people
German female triathletes
Olympic triathletes of Germany
Triathletes at the 2012 Summer Olympics
Triathletes at the 2016 Summer Olympics
Technical University of Munich alumni
Sportspeople from Bayreuth
Ironman world champions